The number of dwarf planets in the Solar System is unknown. Estimates have run as high as 200 in the Kuiper belt and over 10,000 in the region beyond.
However, consideration of the surprisingly low densities of many large trans-Neptunian objects suggests that the number of dwarf planets may be much lower, perhaps only nine among bodies known so far. Only Pluto and Ceres have been confirmed to be in hydrostatic equilibrium, due to the results of the New Horizons and Dawn missions. Eris is generally assumed to be a dwarf planet because it is similar in size to Pluto and even more massive. Haumea and Makemake were accepted as dwarf planets by the IAU for naming purposes and will keep their names if it turns out they are not dwarf planets.

Limiting values 

Beside directly orbiting the Sun, the qualifying feature of a dwarf planet is that it have "sufficient mass for its self-gravity to overcome rigid-body forces so that it assumes a hydrostatic equilibrium (nearly round) shape". Current observations are generally insufficient for a direct determination as to whether a body meets this definition. Often the only clues for trans-Neptunian objects (TNO) is a crude estimate of their diameters and albedos. Icy satellites as large as 1,500 km in diameter have proven to not be in equilibrium, whereas dark objects in the outer solar system often have low densities that imply they are not even solid bodies, much less gravitationally controlled dwarf planets.

, which has a significant amount of ice in its composition, is the only accepted dwarf planet in the asteroid belt, though there are unexplained anomalies. 4 Vesta, the second-most-massive asteroid and one that is basaltic in composition, appears to have a fully differentiated interior and was therefore in equilibrium at some point in its history, but no longer is today. The third-most massive object, 2 Pallas, has a somewhat irregular surface and is thought to have only a partially differentiated interior; it is also less icy than Ceres. Michael Brown has estimated that, because rocky objects such as Vesta are more rigid than icy objects, rocky objects below  in diameter may not be in hydrostatic equilibrium and thus not dwarf planets. The question remains open if the two largest icy outer-belt asteroids 10 Hygiea and 704 Interamnia are also dwarf planets.

Based on a comparison with the icy moons that have been visited by spacecraft, such as Mimas (round at 400 km in diameter) and Proteus (irregular at 410–440 km in diameter), Brown estimated that an icy body relaxes into hydrostatic equilibrium at a diameter somewhere between 200 and 400 km. However, after Brown and Tancredi made their calculations, better determination of their shapes showed that Mimas and the other mid-sized ellipsoidal moons of Saturn up to at least Iapetus (which, at 1,471 km in diameter, is approximately the same size as Haumea and Makemake) are no longer in hydrostatic equilibrium; they are also icier than TNOs are likely to be. They have equilibrium shapes that froze in place some time ago, and do not match the shapes that equilibrium bodies would have at their current rotation rates. Thus Rhea, at 1528 km in diameter, is the smallest body for which gravitational measurements are consistent with current hydrostatic equilibrium. Ceres, at 950 km in diameter, is close to equilibrium, but some deviations from equilibrium shape remain unexplained. Much larger objects, such as Earth's moon and the planet Mercury, are not near hydrostatic equilibrium today, though the Moon is composed primarily of silicate rock and Mercury of metal (in contrast to most dwarf planet candidates, which are ice and rock). Saturn's moons may have been subject to a thermal history that would have produced equilibrium-like shapes in bodies too small for gravity alone to do so. Thus, at present it is unknown whether any trans-Neptunian objects smaller than Pluto and Eris are in hydrostatic equilibrium. 

Brown had speculated that this was due to their composition, that they were almost entirely icy. However, Grundy et al. point out that there is no known mechanism or evolutionary pathway for mid-sized bodies to be icy while both larger and smaller objects are partially rocky.

Tancredi's assessment 
Some diameters were measured, some were best-fit estimates, and others used an assumed albedo of 0.10 to calculate the diameter. Of these, he identified 15 as dwarf planets by his criteria (including the 4 accepted by the IAU), with another 9 being considered possible. To be cautious, he advised the IAU to "officially" accept as dwarf planets the top three not yet accepted: Sedna, Orcus, and Quaoar. Although the IAU had anticipated Tancredi's recommendations, a decade later the IAU had never responded.

Brown's assessment 

Mike Brown considers 130 trans-Neptunian bodies to be "probably" dwarf planets, ranked them by estimated size. He does not consider asteroids, stating "in the asteroid belt Ceres, with a diameter of 900 km, is the only object large enough to be round."

The terms for varying degrees of likelihood he split these into:

Sufficient confidence to say these must be in hydrostatic equilibrium, even if predominantly rocky. 10 objects as of 2020. 
The size would have to be "grossly in error" or they would have to be primarily rocky to not be dwarf planets. 17 objects as of 2020. 
Uncertainties in measurement mean that some of these will be significantly smaller and thus doubtful. 41 objects as of 2020. 
Expected to be dwarf planets, if they are icy, and that figure is correct. 62 objects as of 2020. 
Icy moons transition from a round to irregular shape in the 200–400 km range, suggesting that the same figure holds true for KBOs. Thus, some of these objects could be dwarf planets. 611 objects as of 2020. 
Probably not: diameter estimated/measured to be under 200 km. No icy moon under 200 km is round, and the same may be true of KBOs. The estimated size of these objects would have to be in error for them to be dwarf planets.

Note that although Brown's site claims to be updated daily, these largest objects haven't been updated since late 2013.

Grundy et al.’s assessment 
Bodies in this size range should have begun to collapse the interstitial spaces left over from their formation, but not fully, leaving some residual porosity.

Brown has suggested that large low-density bodies must be composed almost entirely of water ice, since he presumed that bodies of this size would necessarily be solid. However, this leaves unexplained why TNOs both larger than 1000 km and smaller than 400 km, and indeed comets, are composed of a substantial fraction of rock, leaving only this size range to be primarily icy. Experiments with water ice at the relevant pressures and temperatures suggest that substantial porosity could remain in this size range, and it is possible that adding rock to the mix would further increase resistance to collapsing into a solid body. Bodies with internal porosity remaining from their formation could be at best only partially differentiated, in their deep interiors (if a body had begun to collapse into a solid body, there should be evidence in the form of fault systems from when its surface contracted). The higher albedos of larger bodies is also evidence of full differentiation, as such bodies were presumably resurfaced with ice from their interiors.

If Grundy et al. are correct, then very few known bodies in the outer Solar System are likely to have compacted into fully solid bodies, and thus to possibly have become dwarf planets at some point in their past or to still be dwarf planets at present. Pluto–Charon, Eris, Haumea, Gonggong, Makemake, Quaoar, Orcus, and Sedna are either known (Pluto) or strong candidates (the others).

There are a number of smaller bodies, estimated to be between 700 and 900 km diameter, for most of which not enough is known to apply these criteria. All of them are dark, mostly with albedos under 0.11, with brighter  (0.18) an exception; this suggests that they are not dwarf planets. However, Salacia and Varda may be dense enough to at least be solid. If Salacia were spherical and had the same albedo as its moon, it would have a density of between 1.4 and 1.6 g/cm3, calculated a few months after Grundy et al.'s initial assessment, though still an albedo of only 0.04. Varda might have a higher density of 1.78±0.06 g/cm3 (a lower density of 1.23±0.04 g/cm3 was considered possible though less probable), published the year after Grundy et al.'s initial assessment; its albedo of 0.10 is close to Quaoar's.

Likeliest dwarf planets 
The assessments of the IAU, Tancredi et al., Brown, and Grundy et al. for sixteen of the largest potential dwarf planets (the ones whose estimated diameters are above 700 km) are as follows. For the IAU, the acceptance criteria were for naming purposes. An IAU question-and-answer press release from 2006 was more specific: it estimated that objects with mass above  and diameter greater than 800 km (800 km across) would "normally" be in hydrostatic equilibrium ("the shape ... would normally be determined by self-gravity"), but that "all borderline cases would need to be determined by observation." This is close to Grundy et al.'s suggestion for the approximate limit.

Several of these objects had not yet been discovered when Tancredi et al. did their analysis. Brown's sole criterion is diameter; he accepts significantly many more as "highly likely" to be dwarf planets, for which his threshold is 600 km (see below). Grundy et al. did not determine which bodies were dwarf planets, but rather which could not be. A red  marks objects that are not dense enough to be solid bodies; to this is added a question mark for the objects whose densities are not known (they are all dark, suggesting that they are not dwarf planets). The question of current equilibrium was not addressed.

Some objects are included for comparison. Titan has a shape that is consistent with hydrostatic equilibrium, but that has been questioned. Mercury is round but known to be out of equilibrium today. Triton formed as a TNO, and Charon is larger than some dwarf planet candidates.

Largest measured candidates

The following trans-Neptunian objects have measured diameters at least  to within measurement uncertainties; this was the threshold to be considered a "highly likely" dwarf planet in Brown's early assessment. Grundy et al. speculated that 600 km to 700 km diameter could represent "the upper limit to retain substantial internal pore space", and that objects around 900 km could have collapsed interiors but fail to completely differentiate. The two satellites of TNOs that surpass this threshold have also been included: Pluto's moon Charon and Eris' moon Dysnomia.

Ceres, generally accepted as a dwarf planet, is added for comparison. Also added for comparison is Triton, which is thought to have been a dwarf planet in the Kuiper belt before it was captured by Neptune.

Bodies with very poorly known sizes (e.g. "Farout") have been excluded. Explanations and sources for the measured masses and diameters can be found in the corresponding articles linked in column "Designation" of the table.

The bodies with estimated diameter over 900 km are bolded; they have general consensus as being dwarfs, per the previous section. (Charon is also bolded, as it has sometimes been considered a possible dwarf in its own right; Triton is bolded as a former KBO that is still rounded and geologically active. Dysnomia is bolded despite its smaller size, since its density is known to be higher than 1.5 g/cm3.)
Those with estimated diameter between 700 km and 900 km are in bold italic; most are borderline possibilities, but in most cases are too poorly known for much certainty. They tend to be dark, suggesting that they are not dwarf planets, but some might be dense enough to be fully solid bodies.
The others, having estimated diameter below 700 km, are unlikely to be dwarf planets on the basis of current evaluation, but may be transitional (partially compressed) bodies.
Light grey indicates objects whose densities may or may not be higher than 1.5 g/cm3.
Dark grey indicates those whose densities are known to be lower, and hence if the data is correct cannot be dwarf planets.
Satellites are highlighted in pink, as under the current definition a dwarf planet must directly orbit the Sun.

All of these categories are subject to change with further evidence.

{| class="wikitable sortable" style="text-align: center;"
|+Possible dwarf planets with measured sizes or masses(satellites Triton, Charon, Dysnomia included for comparison)
|-
! data-sort-type="number"| Designation
! data-sort-type="number" | H

! data-sort-type="number" | Geometricalbedo
! data-sort-type="number" | Diameter
!Method
! data-sort-type="number"| Mass
! data-sort-type="number"| Density
! Category
|-style="background:#ffb7c5"
| style="text-align: left;" data-sort-value="0.81" | Neptune I Triton ||  || data-sort-value="77.5%"| 60% to 95% || style="background: #e0e0ff;" | 
|direct||  || || satellite of Neptune
|-
| style="text-align: left;" data-sort-value="134340" |  ||  || data-sort-value="57.5%"| 49% to 66% || style="background: #e0e0ff;" | 
|direct||  |||| 2:3 resonant
|-
| style="text-align: left;" data-sort-value="136199" |  || || 96% || style="background: #e0e0ff;" |  
|occultation||  |||| SDO
|-
| style="text-align: left;" data-sort-value="136108" |  || || 49% || style="background: #e0e0ff;" | 
|occultation||  || || cubewano
|-
| style="text-align: left;" data-sort-value="136472" |  || || 83% || style="background: #e0e0ff;" |  
|occultation||  |||| cubewano
|-
| style="text-align: left;" data-sort-value="225088" |  ||  || 14% || style="background: #e0e0ff;" |  
|thermal||  |||| 3:10 resonant
|-style="background:#ffb7c5"
| style="text-align: left;" data-sort-value="134340.5" |  ||  || data-sort-value="35%"| 20% to 50% || style="background: #e0e0ff;" | 
|direct||  |||| satellite of Pluto
|-
| style="text-align: left;" data-sort-value="50000" |  ||  || 11% || style="background: #e0e0ff;" |  
|occultation||  |||| cubewano
|- style="background: #e8e8e8;"
| style="text-align: left;" data-sort-value="90377" |  ||  || 32% ± 6% || style="background: #e0e0ff;" |  
|thermal||? ||?|| detached
|-
| style="text-align: left;" data-sort-value="1" |  ||  || 9% || style="background: #e0e0ff;" |  
|direct||  |||| asteroid belt
|- style="background: #e8e8e8;"
| style="text-align: left;" data-sort-value="90482" |  ||  || 23% ± 2% || style="background: #e0e0ff;" |  
|thermal||  |||| 2:3 resonant
|- style="background: #e8e8e8;"
| style="text-align: left;" data-sort-value="120347" |  || || 5% || style="background: #e0ffff;" |  
|thermal||  |||| cubewano
|- style="background: #e8e8e8;"
| style="text-align: left;" data-sort-value="307261" |  || || 10% || style="background: #e0ffff;" |  
|occultation|| ||?|| cubewano
|- style="background: #e8e8e8;"
| style="text-align: left;" data-sort-value="55565" |  || || 11% || style="background: #e0ffff;" |  
|thermal|| ||?|| cubewano
|- style="background: #e8e8e8;"
| style="text-align: left;" data-sort-value="174567" |  || || 11% || style="background: #e0ffff;" | 
|occultation||  ||? or?|| cubewano
|- style="background: #e8e8e8;"
| style="text-align: left;" data-sort-value="532037" |  ||  || 18% || style="background: #e0ffff;" |  
|thermal|| ||?|| SDO
|- style="background: #e8e8e8;"
| style="text-align: left;" data-sort-value="28978" |  ||  || 10% || style="background: #e0ffff;" | 
|occultation|| ||?|| 2:3 resonant
|- style="background: #cccccc;"
| style="text-align: left;" data-sort-value="208996" |  ||  || 11% || style="background: #e0ffff;" |  
|occultation|| |||| 2:3 resonant
|-style="background:#ffb7c5"
| style="text-align: left;" data-sort-value="136199.5" | 136199 Eris I Dysnomia' ||  || data-sort-value="4%"| % || style="background: #e0ffff;" |  || thermal ||  || data-sort-value=""|  || satellite of Eris
|- style="background: #e8e8e8;"
| style="text-align: left;" data-sort-value="90568" |  || || 8% || style="background: #e0ffff;" |  
|thermal|| ||?|| cubewano
|- style="background: #e8e8e8;"
| style="text-align: left;" data-sort-value="145452" |  ||  || 11% || style="background: #e0ffff;" |  
|thermal|| ||?|| cubewano
|- style="background: #cccccc;"
| style="text-align: left;" data-sort-value="55637" |  ||  || 12% || style="background: #e0ffff;" | 
|thermal||  |||| cubewano
|- style="background: #cccccc;"
| style="text-align: left;" data-sort-value="229762" | || || 14% || style="background: #e0ffff;" | 
|occultation||  |||| SDO
|- style="background: #cccccc;"
| style="text-align: left;" data-sort-value="20000" |  || || 12% || style="background: #e0ffff;" | 
|thermal|| |||| cubewano
|- style="background: #e8e8e8;"
| style="text-align: left;" data-sort-value="145451" | || || 11% || style="background: #e0ffff; " | 
|occultation|| ||?|| SDO
|- style="background: #e8e8e8;"
| style="text-align: left;" data-sort-value="992014202502" |  ||  || 14% || style="background: #e0ffff;" |  
|thermal|| ||?|| SDO
|- style="background: #e8e8e8;"
| style="text-align: left;" data-sort-value="19521" |  ||  || 5% || style="background: #e0ffff;" |  
|thermal|| ||?|| cubewano
|- style="background: #e8e8e8;"
| style="text-align: left;" data-sort-value="78799" |  ||  || 4% || style="background: #e0ffff;" |  
|thermal|| ||?|| SDO
|}

Brightest unmeasured candidates
For objects without a measured size or mass, sizes can only be estimated by assuming an albedo. Most sub-dwarf objects are thought to be dark, because they haven't been resurfaced; this means that they are also relatively large for their magnitudes. Below is a table for assumed albedos between 4% (the albedo of Salacia) and 20% (a value above which suggests resurfacing), and the sizes objects of those albedos would need to be (if round) to produce the observed absolute magnitude. Backgrounds are blue for >900 km and cyan for >600km.

 See also 
 Lists of astronomical objects
 List of trans-Neptunian objects
 List of gravitationally rounded objects of the Solar System
 List of former planets
 Planetary-mass moon

 References 
 

 External links 
NASA JPL Small-Body Database Search Engine
TNOs are cool public database, incl. diameters and albedos measured by Herschel and Spitzer to date, Herschel OT KP "TNOs are Cool: A Survey of the Transneptunian Region"
 How many dwarf planets are there in the outer solar system? (updates daily) (Mike Brown)
 Details on the dwarf planet size calculations (Mike Brown)
 Which are the Dwarfs in the Solar System? Tancredi, G.; Favre, S. Icarus'', Volume 195, Issue 2, p. 851–862.

 
Possible dwarf planets
Lists of trans-Neptunian objects